There are two hamlets that can be referred to as Ionia, New York.

A hamlet in West Bloomfield, Ontario County.
A hamlet in Van Buren, Onondaga County.